Spilarctia hampsoni is a moth in the family Erebidae. It was described by James John Joicey and George Talbot in 1916. It is found in Papua (Anggi Lakes, Bidogai, Langda, Mokndoma, Pass Valley) and Papua New Guinea (Mount Hagen).

References

Moths described in 1916
hampsoni